West African Pidgin English, also known as Guinea Coast Creole English, is a West African pidgin language lexified by English and local African languages. It originated as a language of commerce between British and African slave traders during the period of the transatlantic slave trade.  about 75 million people in Nigeria, Cameroon, Ghana and Equatorial Guinea used the language. 

Because it is primarily a spoken language, there is no standardized written form, and many local varieties exist. These include Sierra Leone Krio, Nigerian Pidgin, Ghanaian Pidgin English, Cameroonian Pidgin English, Liberian Pidgin English, the Aku dialect of Krio, and Pichinglis.

History
West African Pidgin English arose during the period of the transatlantic slave trade as a language of commerce between British and African slave traders. Portuguese merchants were the first Europeans to trade in West Africa beginning in the 15th century, and West African Pidgin English contains numerous words of Portuguese origin such as "sabi" (to know), a derivation of the Portuguese "saber". Later, as British merchants arrived to engage in the slave trade, they developed this language in combination with local African slave traders in order to facilitate their commercial exchanges.

The language quickly spread up the river systems into the West African interior because of its value as a trade language among Africans of different tribes. Later in the language's history, this useful trading language was adopted as a native language by new communities of Africans and mixed-race people living in coastal slave trading bases such as James Island, Bunce Island, Elmina Castle, Cape Coast Castle and Anomabu. At that point, it became a creole language.

Some scholars call this language "West African Pidgin English" to emphasize its role as a lingua franca pidgin used for trading. Others call it "Guinea Coast Creole English" to emphasize its role as a creole native language spoken in and around the coastal slave castles and slave trading centers by people permanently based there. The existence of this influential language during the slave trade era is attested by the many descriptions of it recorded by early European travelers and slave traders. They called it the "Coast English" or the "Coast Jargon". 

A British slave trader in Sierra Leone, John Matthews, mentioned pidgin English in a letter he later published in a book titled A Voyage to the River Sierra-Leone on the Coast of Africa. Matthews refers to West African Pidgin English as a "jargon", and he warns Europeans coming to Africa that they will fail to understand the Africans unless they recognize that there are significant differences between English and the coastal pidgin:

 Those who visit Africa in a cursory manner ... are very liable to be mistaken in the meaning of the natives from want of knowledge in their language, or in the jargon of such of them as reside upon the sea-coast and speak a little English; the European affixing the same ideas to the words spoken by the African, as if they were pronounced by one of his own nation. [This] is a specimen of the conversation which generally passes.  

Matthews supplied an example of West African Pidgin English:

Modern Africa
West African Pidgin English remained in use in West Africa after the abolition of the slave trade by Western nations and the decolonization of Africa. Many distinct regional variants of the language emerged. Looked down upon during the colonial era as a bastardization of proper English – a stigma still attached to it by some – Pidgin nonetheless remains in widespread use. In 2016, there was an estimated five million individuals who use Pidgin as a primary language for everyday use in Nigeria. 

As of 2017, about 75 million people in Nigeria, Cameroon, Ghana and Equatorial Guinea speak the language. During the rise of African nationalism, it became a "language of resistance and anti-colonialism", and political activists still use it to criticize their post-colonial political leaders.

Over the last hundred years the amount of English-lexifer based creoles in West African countries currently being used as primary and secondary language has increased greatly, with speakers currently exceeding one hundred million.

Because West African Pidgin English is a primarily spoken language, there is no standardized written form, and many local varieties exist. In August 2017, the BBC launched a Pidgin news service, aimed at audiences in West and Central Africa, as part of its World Service branch. As part of that effort, the BBC developed a guide for a standardized written form of pidgin.

Structure
Like other pidgin and creole languages, West African Pidgin English took the majority of its vocabulary from the dominant colonial language in the environment where it developed (English), and much of its sound system, grammar, and syntax from the local substrate languages (West African Niger–Congo languages).  

The English dialect that served as the lexifier for West African Pidgin English was not the speech of Britain's educated classes, but the Nautical English spoken by British sailors who manned the slave ships that sailed to Africa as part of the triangular trade. Nautical speech contained words from British regional dialects as well as specialized ship vocabulary. Evidence of this early nautical speech can be found in the modern pidgin and creole languages derived from West African Pidgin English. 

In Sierra Leone Krio, for instance, words derived from English regional dialects include padi ("friend"), krabit ("stingy"), and berin ("funeral"). Words from specialized ship vocabulary include kohtlas [from "cutlass"] ("machete"), flog ("beat", "punish"), eys [from "hoist"] ("to lift"), and dek ("floor").

Historical impact
The various pidgin and creole languages still spoken in West Africa today – the Aku language in The Gambia, Sierra Leone Krio, Nigerian Pidgin English, Ghanaian Pidgin English, Cameroonian Pidgin English, Fernando Po Creole English, etc. – are all derived from the early West African Pidgin English. These contemporary English-based pidgin and creole languages are so similar that they are increasingly grouped together under the name "West African Pidgin English", although the term originally designated only the original trade language spoken on the West African coast two hundred years ago.

Some scholars argue that African slaves took West African Pidgin English to the New World where it helped give rise to the English-based creoles that developed there, including the Gullah language in coastal South Carolina and Georgia, Bahamian Dialect, Jamaican Creole, Belizean Kriol, Guyanese Creole, Sranan Tongo in Suriname, etc. Since the slaves taken to the Americas spoke many different African languages, they would have found West African Pidgin English as useful as a lingua franca on the plantations as they had found it back home in West Africa as a trading language. Their enslaved children born in the Americas would have adopted different versions of West African Pidgin English as their "native" languages, thus creating a series of New World English-based creoles.

The similarities among the many English-based pidgin and creole languages spoken today on both sides of the Atlantic are due, at least in part, to their common derivation from the early West African Pidgin English. Note the following examples, all of which mean "They are going there to eat rice":

Sierra Leone Krio: "Dem dey go eat res"

Ghanaian Pidgin English: "Dem dey go chop rais"

Nigerian Pidgin English: "Dem dey go chop rice"

Cameroonian Pidgin English: "Dey di go for go chop rice"

Gullah: "Dem duh gwine fuh eat rice"

See also 
 Languages of Africa
 Ian Hancock, linguist and scholar of pidgin and creole languages

References

External links
 Richard Nordquist, "West African Pidgin English (WAPE)"

English-based pidgins and creoles of Africa
West African culture